Phil may refer to:

 Phil (given name), a shortened version of masculine and feminine names
 Phill, a given name also spelled "Phil"
 Phil, Kentucky, United States
 Phil (film), a 2019 film
 -phil-, a lexical fragment, used as a root term for many words
 Philippines, a country in Southeast Asia, frequently abbreviated as PHIL
 Philosophy, abbreviated as "phil."
 Philology, abbreviated as "phil."

See also

 Master of Philosophy (M.Phil)
 Doctor of Philosophy (D.Phil or Ph.D)
 University Philosophical Society, known as "The Phil"
 
 Big Phil (disambiguation)
 Dr. Phil (disambiguation)
 Fil (disambiguation)
 Fill (disambiguation)
 Philip (disambiguation)
 Philipp
 Philippa
 Philippic
 Philipps